Leonid Faivelevych Barbier (9 April 1937 – 15 January 2023) was a Ukrainian swimmer. He competed at the 1960 Summer Olympics in the 100 m backstroke and 4 × 100 m medley relay and finished in fifth place in both events. He won two European titles in 1958 and 1962.

During his career he set six European records: four in individual backstroke events and two in the medley relay, as well as 15 national records. Around 1989 he was active in masters swimming, winning three European and national titles. In 1989 he also briefly acted as president of the Moscow federation of masters swimming. His wife is a famous swimming coach.

Barbier died on 15 January 2023, at the age of 85.

References

External links
Early years (in Russian, 1957)

1937 births
2023 deaths
Sportspeople from Kyiv
European Aquatics Championships medalists in swimming
Olympic swimmers of the Soviet Union
Swimmers at the 1960 Summer Olympics
Honoured Masters of Sport of the USSR
Male backstroke swimmers
Ukrainian male swimmers
Soviet male swimmers